The Order of the Indian Wars of the United States (OIWUS) is a military society founded in 1896 by officers of the United States Army who served in campaigns against Native Americans from the American Revolution to the late 19th century.

History
The OIWUS was founded by Colonel B.J.D. Irwin at Fort Sheridan near Chicago. It was patterned after other American military societies such as the Society of the Cincinnati, the Aztec Club of 1847 and the Military Order of the Loyal Legion of the United States. Its primary purpose is to provide fellowship to is members and preserve the history of the Indian Wars.  The correct name of the OIWUS is the "Order of Indian Wars," not "Order of THE Indian Wars."  The latter name belongs to a Colorado-based group of Indian wars enthusiasts.  Earlier references here to the "Order of the Indian Wars" are incorrect.

Objects
According to its constitution the objects of the OIWUS are to

Membership
Membership originally consisted of veteran officers (termed Original Companions) and their male descendants (termed Hereditary Companions). Over the first fifty years of the Order's existence its membership included 300 Original Companions, 275 Hereditary Companions and 75 Junior Companions. In time, the Original Companions died out and the only members were hereditary companions. More recently, membership was expanded to include descendants of soldiers who served in wars with Native Americans dating back to the early 1600s.

Currently, Hereditary Companions can be either (1) the direct lineal or collateral descendants of Original Companions of the Order, or (2) Commissioned Officers of the United States Armed Forces, who are direct lineal descendants of honorably discharged enlisted men who had the qualifications requisite for eligibility for membership as Original Companions, save that of having been commissioned.

Membership may also be considered for gentlemen who are lineally descended from persons, of any rank, who engaged in combat against Native Americans serving in a military unit under the British Crown, prior to June 14, 1776. Membership is by invitation only.

Companions
Lieutenant General Nelson A. Miles - Medal of Honor recipient U.S. Army Commanding General
Lieutenant General Samuel Baldwin Marks Young - Medal of Honor recipient - U.S. Army Commanding General
Major General Zenas R. Bliss - Medal of Honor recipient
Major General Joseph T. Dickman
Major General Frederick D. Grant - Son of Ulysses S. Grant
Major General James Parker (Medal of Honor) - Medal of Honor recipient
Major General Leonard Wood - Medal of Honor recipient
Major General Hugh L. Scott - U.S. Army Chief of Staff
Major General William W. Wotherspoon - U.S. Army Chief of Staff
Brigadier General Thomas Lincoln Casey, Sr. - Chief Engineer for the U.S. Army
Brigadier General Frederick Phisterer - Medal of Honor recipient
Brigadier General Marion Maus - Medal of Honor recipient
Brigadier General Bernard J. D. Irwin - Medal of Honor recipient
Colonel Charles Heyl - Medal of Honor recipient
Colonel Herbert Jermain Slocum - Cavalry officer
Major John O. Skinner - Medal of Honor recipient

References

Organizations established in 1896
Indian wars of the American Old West
Fraternal orders
Lineage societies